Arturo Israel Salazar Martínez (born January 3, 1988), known as Arturo Salazar, is a professional squash player who represented Mexico. He reached a career-high world ranking of World No. 36 in January 2011. He won two Golds and a Bronze medal at the 2011 Pan American Games, in the Doubles, Team and Singles. His twin brother César Orlando Salazar Martínez is also a professional squash player.

References

External links 
 
 

1988 births
Living people
Mexican male squash players
Pan American Games medalists in squash
Pan American Games gold medalists for Mexico
Pan American Games bronze medalists for Mexico
Squash players at the 2011 Pan American Games
Squash players at the 2015 Pan American Games
Squash players at the 2019 Pan American Games
Medalists at the 2011 Pan American Games
Medalists at the 2015 Pan American Games
Medalists at the 2019 Pan American Games
Twin sportspeople
Mexican twins
Sportspeople from San Luis Potosí